{{Speciesbox
|image = Euploea phaenareta hollandi MHNT.ZOO.2004.0.768.jpg
|image_caption = Euploea phaenareta hollandi specimen
|taxon = Euploea phaenareta
|authority = (Schaller, 1785)
|synonyms =
Papilio phaenareta  Schaller, 1785
Papilio affinis  Gmelin, 1790
Trepsichrois alea  Hübner, 1816
Danais prothoe  Godart, 1819
Danais cora  Godart, 1819
Euploea gyllenhalii  Lucas, 1853
Euploea cuvieri  C. & R. Felder, [1865]
Euploea elisa  Butler, 1866
Euploea callithoe var. fucosa  Janson, 1886
Euploea durrsteini ab. nera  Staudinger, 1895
Macroploea corus vitrina  Fruhstorfer, 1898
Euploea grandis  Moore, 1883
Euploea godmani  Moore, 1883
Euploea majuma  Ribbe, 1898
pauperata  Fruhstorfer, 1910
luxurianta  Fruhstorfer, 1910
privata  Fruhstorfer, 1910
biplagiata  Fruhstorfer, 1910
erynia  Fruhstorfer, 1910
praestabilis  Fruhstorfer, 1910
honrathi  Fruhstorfer, 1910
Euploea callithoe <small> morna  Fruhstorfer, 1912Euploea f. erynia  Fruhstorfer, 1912Euploea callithoe arova  Fruhstorfer, 1913Euploea callithoe admiralia f. aruana  Strand, 1914fucosa  Hulstaert, 1931pavettae  Fabricius, 1938goodsoni  Corbet, 1942rigneyi  Jumalon, 1971violescens  Morishita, 1981Papilio corus  Fabricius, 1793Euploea pavettae  Zinken, 1831Euploea callithoe  Boisduval, 1832Euploea hansemanni  Honrath, 1888Euploea durrsteini  Staudinger, 1890Euploea durrsteini  Staudinger, 1891eurykleia  Fruhstorfer, 1910Euploea castelnaui  C. & R. Felder, [1865]Euploea phoebus  Butler, 1866Euploea euthoë  C. & R. Felder, [1865]Euploea semicirculus  Butler, 1866Euploea mesocala  Vollenhoven, 1872Euploea unibrunnea  Salvin & Godman, 1877Euploea browni  Salvin & Godman, 1877Euploea althaea  Semper, 1878Euploea drucei  Moore, 1883Euploea butleri  Moore, 1883Euploea heurippa  Godman & Salvin, 1888Macroploea phaenareta micronesia  Doherty, 1891Euploea eucala  Staudinger, 1896Macroploea corus celebica  Fruhstorfer, 1898Euploea castelnaui var. salvini  Staudinger, 1889Macroploea corus locupletior  Fruhstorfer, 1900Macroploea phaenareta irma  Fruhstorfer, 1903Macroploea corus defiguratus  Fruhstorfer, 1908Euploea (Salpinx) juvia  Fruhstorfer, 1908Euploea callithoe admiralia  Strand, 1914
}}Euploea phaenareta, the giant crow is a butterfly in the family Nymphalidae. It was described by Johann Gottlieb Schaller in 1785. It is found in the Indomalayan realm and the Australasian realm. 
 
SubspeciesE. p. phaenareta (Ambon, Serang)E. p. corus (Fabricius, 1793) (Sri Lanka, Burma)E. p. pavettae Zinken, 1831 (Java)E. p. callithoe Boisduval, 1832 (New Guinea, Louisiades, Goodenough, Fergusson, Woodlark, Kiriwina Islands)E. p. castelnaui C. & R. Felder, [1865] (Burma to Peninsular Malaysia, Langkawi, Singapore, Thailand)E. p. euthoe C. & R. Felder, [1865] (Aru, Kai)E. p. semicirculus Butler, 1866 (Bachan, Halmahera, Morotai)E. p. mesocala Vollenhoven, 1872 (Waigeu)E. p. unibrunnea Salvin & Godman, 1877 (eastern New Guinea, New Britain, Duke of York Island, New Ireland, Queen Charlotte Island, Feni Island)E. p. althaea Semper, 1878 (Philippines: Mindanao)E. p. drucei Moore, 1883 (Thailand, Vietnam)E. p. butleri Moore, 1883 (Borneo)E. p. phaeretena Kheil, 1884 (Nias)E. p. heurippa Godman & Salvin, 1888 (Solomon Islands)E. p. micronesia (Doherty, 1891) (Enggano)E. p. eucala Staudinger, 1896 (Sumbawa, Flores, Sumba)E. p. celebica (Fruhstorfer, 1898) (Sulawesi)E. p. salvini Staudinger, 1889 (Palawan)E. p. locupletior (Fruhstorfer, 1900) (Talaud Island)E. p. irma (Fruhstorfer, 1903) (Obi)E. p. hollandi Fruhstorfer, 1904 (Buru)E. p. rolanda Fruhstorfer, 1904 (Sula Island)E. p. defiguratus (Fruhstorfer, 1908) (Bali)E. p. juvia Fruhstorfer, 1908 (Taiwan)E. p. sacerdotalis Fruhstorfer, 1910 (Jobi)E. p. nikrion Fruhstorfer, 1910 (Bawean)E. p. hesiodus Fruhstorfer, 1910 (Bangka)E. p. statius Fruhstorfer, 1910 (Sumatra)E. p. admiralia Strand, 1914 (Admiralty Islands)E. p. ornae Schröder & Treadaway, 1979 (Philippines: Samar)

Biology
The larva feeds on Cerbera - C. floribunda, C. manghas, and Plumeria species.

References

External links
Euploea at Markku Savela's Lepidoptera and Some Other Life Forms''

Euploea
Butterflies described in 1785